The 1960 All-Eastern football team consists of American football players chosen by various selectors as the best players at each position among the Eastern colleges and universities during the 1960 NCAA University Division football season. 

The 1961 All-Eastern team included 1961 Heisman Trophy winner Ernie Davis of Syracuse.

Backs  
 Pat McCarthy, Holy Cross (AP-1)
 Ernie Davis, Syracuse (AP-1)
 Al Rushatz, Army (AP-1)
 Steve Simms, Rutgers (AP-1)

Ends 
 Bob Mitinger, Penn State (AP-1)
 Greg Mather, Navy (AP-1)

Tackles 
 Bob Asack, Columbia (AP-1)
 Dale Kuhns, Army (AP-1)

Guards 
 Larry Vignali, Pittsburgh (AP-1)
 John Hewitt, Navy (AP-1)

Center 
 Alex Kroll, Rutgers (AP-1)

Key
 AP = Associated Press
 UPI = United Press International

See also
 1961 College Football All-America Team

References

All-Eastern
All-Eastern college football teams